Balapan may refer to:

Balapan (TV channel), a children's television channel in Kazakhstan
 Balapan, Republic of Bashkortostan, Russia
Balapan Station (Solo Balapan), the largest railway station in Surakarta, Indonesia
Lake Chagan (known also as Lake Balapan), a lake in Kazakhstan created by the Chagan nuclear test fired on January 15, 1965